Jean-Marie Stéphanopoli (born 27 August 1972) is a French former professional footballer who played as a defender.

References

Living people
1972 births
People from Montreuil, Seine-Saint-Denis
Association football defenders
French footballers
Red Star F.C. players
Lille OSC players
Stade Lavallois players
Amiens SC players
Stade de Reims players